The list of hoards in the Channel Islands comprises significant archaeological hoards of coins, jewellery, precious and scrap metal objects and other valuable items discovered in the Channel Islands (Jersey, Guernsey, Alderney, Sark, Herm and associated smaller islands). It includes both hoards that were buried with the intention of retrieval at a later date (personal hoards, founder's hoards, merchant's hoards, and hoards of loot), and also hoards of votive offerings which were not intended to be recovered at a later date, but excludes grave goods and single items found in isolation. The list is subdivided into sections according to archaeological and historical periods.

At least fifteen hoards have been found in the Channel Islands since the early 18th century, most of them in Jersey, and only one each in Guernsey, Alderney and Sark.  Of the known hoards, about a third date to the Bronze Age and are mostly founder's hoards comprising broken tools, weapons and other scrap metal buried with the intention of recovery at a later date for use in casting new bronze items.  Another third are hoards of Iron Age Celtic coins, mostly coins called staters cast in debased silver (billon alloy), the majority deriving from Armorica (modern Brittany and Normandy in France), but some deriving from Southern Britain.  The remaining hoards comprise Roman coins, some of which may have been buried by Armorican Celts fleeing from Roman armies during the campaigns of Julius Caesar in the mid 1st century B.C.  Although the contents of most Iron Age and Roman hoards found in the Channel Islands originated from nearby France or Britain, one hoard that was discovered in Guernsey during the late 19th century comprised Roman coins minted in Alexandria in Egypt during the late 3rd century A.D.

Bronze Age hoards
The table below list hoards that are associated with the Bronze Age, approximately 1300 BC to 700 BC.

Iron Age hoards
The table below list hoards that are associated with the Iron Age, approximately 8th century BC to the 1st century AD.

Roman hoards
The table below list hoards of Roman artefacts and Roman coins.

See also

 List of hoards in Great Britain
 List of hoards in Ireland
 List of hoards in the Isle of Man
 List of metal detecting finds
 History of Guernsey
 History of Jersey

Footnotes

Archaeology-related lists
Treasure troves
History of the Channel Islands
Channel Islands-related lists
Channel islands